Frederick Bourne may refer to:

Sir Frederick Chalmers Bourne (1891–1977), English colonial administrator in India (son of Frederick Samuel Augustus Bourne)
Frederick Gilbert Bourne (1851–1919), president of the Singer Manufacturing Company
Frederick Munroe Bourne (1910–1992), Canadian Olympic swimmer 
Sir Frederick Samuel Augustus Bourne (1854–1940), Judge of the British Supreme Court for China and Japan
Frederick William Bourne (1830–1905), English preacher and author